Acea Spa (originally an acronym for Azienda Comunale Elettricità e Acque—Electricity and Water Municipal Utility) is a multiutility operative in the management and development of networks and services in the water, energy and environmental sectors. Originally the city of Rome's provider, the Acea group is the main national operator in the water sector with a catchment area of about 9 million people, and manages integrated water services—aqueduct, sewerage and purification—that span the territories of Rome and Frosinone, as well as their respective provinces. Acea is also present in the regions of Lazio, Tuscany, Umbria, Molise and Campania, is listed on the Milan Stock Exchange and is part of the FTSE Italia Mid Cap index.

History
Rome’s Municipal Electric company, better known by its Italian acronym AEM (for "Azienda Elettrica Municipale"), was founded in 1909 to provide public and private street lighting. In 1912, AEM opened the Centrale Montemartini, its first thermoelectric power plant through which AEM started selling electricity in Rome.

In 1937, the governor of Rome entrusted the company with building and managing of aqueducts as well as the water distribution network for the city. With the newfound responsibilities, AEM changed its name to AGEA (an acronym for "Azienda Governatoriale Elettricità e Acque", Italian for "Government Electricity and Water Company") before changing it again to its current name Acea in 1945. At the end of World War II, the Centrale Montemartini was the only available power plant still operational because it coincidentally escaped the bombings.

In 1953, the Municipal Council of Rome approved Acea’s plan for self-sufficiency in electricity with the aim of improving the city's water system. For the Rome Olympics in 1960, Acea also took responsibility for the city’s public lighting systems.

In 1964, Acea gained control of Rome’s entire water network on the expiry of the concession to Acqua Pia Antica Marcia for the management of the Marcio Aqueduct.

In 1976, Acea’s plan for hydro-sanitary and street lighting refurbishment was approved within the framework of the redevelopment policy of Rome’s suburbs launched by the Rome Municipality. In 1979, the Peschiera-Capore aqueduct system was completed, which continues to be Rome's main water source.

It was in 1985 that the company completed the management of the water cycle by taking on purification services.

In 1989, Acea changed its name from “Azienda Comunale Elettricità” (Municipal Electricity and Water Agency) to “Azienda Comunale dell’Energia e dell’Ambiente” (Municipal Agency of Energy and the Environment).

In the nineteen eighties and nineties, the Tor di Valle cogeneration plant began operation (in 1984, converted later to combined cycle from 1996) and the EUR water centre was inaugurated (1993).

In 1992, Acea became a Special Agency and, from the first of January, 1998, a Joint Stock Company (Acea S.p.A.) which, with Chief Executive Officer Paolo Cuccia at the helm, made its entrance on the Milan Stock Exchange on the 16th of July the following year.

In 2000, Acea entered the foreign market by constructing and conceding of a water plant in Lima (Peru).

In 2001, Acea acquired the Enel branch responsible for electricity distribution in the metropolitan area of Rome.

In the early 2000s, Acea took over the management of the integrated water service of ATO 3 Sarnese-Vesuviano in Campania, ATO 5 Lazio Meridionale-Frosinone and, for the Tuscan region, ATO 2 (Pisa), ATO 3 (Florence) and ATO 6 Grosseto-Siena through a group of subsidiary companies.

On 12 January 2018, Acea and Open Fiber stipulated an agreement for the development of an ultra-wide band communication network in Rome. In the same year, Acea entered the gas distribution sector.

On 10 July 2019, Acea, the Rome Municipality and the Lazio Region signed the renewal of the concession until 2031 for the management of the Peschiera aqueduct, an agreement made in light of the plan to double its size.

Activities
Through the Group’s companies, Acea deals with: the integrated water service, production and distribution of electricity (including public and artistic lighting), the sale of energy and gas and waste treatment. These activities are divided into 7 areas:

Water
Acea is the leading operator in the water sector in Italy (2021), serving 9 million inhabitants. In addition to managing the integrated water service of Rome and Frosinone, it operates in other areas of Lazio, Tuscany, Umbria, Campania and Molise.

Environment
The Acea Group is responsible for waste management with 1.52 million tons of waste managed every year.

With an eye on a circular economy, it manages composting plants like the one in Aprilia, the largest in Lazio, and the anaerobic digestion plant of Monterotondo Marittimo in Tuscany. In 2019, Acea entered the plastics treatment sector.

It also manages waste-to-energy plants in San Vittore and Terni.

Generation
Acea is one of the leading Italian players in the energy generation from renewable sources, with over 1 TWh of energy produced.

It is particularly present in the photovoltaic sector with an overall capacity of about 73 MWp, in the thermoelectric sector with 107 MW and in the hydroelectric one with 121 MW.

Commercial and trading
It sells electricity and natural gas to medium-sized companies and families.

It also offers services related to electric mobility and organic waste composting.

Energy infrastructures
It supplies 9.2 TWh of electricity to Rome and the surrounding municipalities, managing its public and artistic lighting.

Acea is also working on projects regarding energy efficiency and smart grids.

Engineering and services
Acea designs, constructs and manages energy infrastructures and integrated water systems.

Overseas
The Group also operates in Latin America, managing water operations in Honduras, the Dominican Republic and Peru, where it serves about 10 million inhabitants.

Group structure
Source:

Water 
 Acea Ato 2: 96%
 Acea Ato 5: 98%
 Sarnese Vesuviano: 99%
 Gori: 37%
 Acea Molise: 100%
 Umbriadue Servizi Idrici: 99%
 Servizio Idrico Integrato: 40%
 Umbra Acque: 40%
 Ombrone: 99%
 Acquedotto del Fiora: 40%
 Acque Blu - Arno Basso: 77%
 Acque: 45%
 Acque Blu Fiorentine: 75%
 Publiacqua: 40%
 GESESA: 58%
 G.E.A.L: 48%
 Intesa Aretina: 35%
 Nuove Acque: 46%
 Aditribuzionegas: 51%
 Notaresco Gas: 55%

Commercial and trading 
 Acea Energia: 100% 
 Umbria Energy: 50%
 Acea Innovation:100%
 Acea Energy Management: 100%

Generation
 Acea Produzione: 100% 
 Ecogena: 100%
 Acea Solar: 100%
 Energia: 49%
 Acea Renewable: 100%
 Acea Sun Capital: 100%
 Acea Green: 100%
 KT4: 100%
 Solaria Real Estate: 100%
 Trinovolt: 100%
 Marche Solar: 100%
 Euroline3: 100%
 IFV Energy: 100%
 PF Power of Future: 100%
 JB Solar: 100%
 M2D: 100%
 Solarplant: 100%
 Belaria: 49%
 Fergas: 100%

Engineering and services 
 Acea Elabori: 100% 
 Simam: 70%
 Technologies Water Services: 100%
 Ingegnerie Toscane: 44%

Environment 
 Acea Ambiente: 100% 
 Demap: 100%
 AS Recycling: 90%
 Iseco: 80%
 Berg: 60%
 Cavallari: 60%
 MEG: 60%
 Ferrocart: 60%
 Deco: 100%
 Ecologica Sangro: 100%
 Aquaser: 85%
 Ecomed: 50%
 Acque Industriali: 51%

Energy infrastructures 
 Areti: 100%

Overseas
 Acea International 100% 
 Acea Dominicana: 100%
 Aguas de San Pedro: 61%
 Consorcio Agua Azul: 44%
 Acea Perù: 100%
 Consorcio Acea - Acea Dominicana: 100%
 Aguazul Bogotà: 51%

Operations 
 59,100 km of drinking water network managed by Acea
 7 Hydroelectric power plants
 2 Thermoelectric power plants 
 2 Waste-to-energy plants 
 1 Plastics treatment plant 
 Over 227,600 lamps for Rome public and artistic lighting

Financial information

Board of directors 
Board members in charge until the approval of the 2022 Annual Report:

 Barbara Marinali - Chairperson
 Fabrizio Palermo - Chief Executive Officer
 Alessandro Caltagirone, Massimiliano Capece Minutolo Del Sasso, Gabriella Chiellino, Liliana Godino, Giacomo Larocca, Francesca Menabuoni, Massimiliano Pellegrini - Non-executive directors

Ownership structure 
Source:
 Roma Capitale: 51.00%
 Suez SA: 23.33%
 Francesco Gaetano Caltagirone: 5.45%
 Market: 20.22%

References 

Italian companies established in 1909
Energy companies of Italy
Energy companies established in 1909